Brooms manufactured from broomcorn became specifically subject to an increase in US import tariffs in 1996. In response to the US action, chief exporter of broomcorn brooms Mexico requested dispute settlement from an arbitration tribunal of NAFTA, which eventually decided in Mexico's favor. It was one of only three cases to be decided under the provisions of Chapter 20 of NAFTA.

The Broom Corn Brooms Dispute 
"IN THE MATTER OF THE U.S. SAFEGUARD ACTION TAKEN ON BROOM CORN BROOMS FROM MEXICO" was a case brought before the NAFTA Free Trade Commission by the Mexican government, citing the US as respondent.

Factual background

Pre-NAFTA tariffs 

In 1965 the US charged the following tariffs on broomcorn brooms to countries with most-favored-nation (MFN) status: 121,478 dozen at 8% ad valorem, and additional brooms at 32 cents each (for brooms under 96 cents in value) or 32% ad valorem (for those worth 96 cents and over).

NAFTA tariff obligations 
From 1 January 1994, following the signing of NAFTA, US tariffs on broomcorn brooms were set at the following rate: all brooms worth less than 96 cents were duty-free, the first 100,000 dozen worth 96 cents or more were duty-free, and imports in excess of this figure were to be subject to a duty of 22.4% ad valorem from 1994 to 1999, a duty of 16% from 2000 to 2004, and duty-free after 2004.

U.S. Safeguards proceedings 

In March 1996 the US Cornbrooms Task Force, an industry interest group, submitted two petitions to the US International Trade Court (ITC) – one under the Trade Act of 1974 and one under NAFTA – to allege serious injury as a result of rapidly increasing imports of broomcorn brooms from Mexico under the new duty-free provisions. In July 1996 the ITC ruled that there was material harm to the cornbrooms manufacturers and they were entitled to relief in both petitions. In August 1996 the ITC sent its report to the US President. On 28 November 1996, following the recommendations laid out in the ITC report, President Clinton issued Proclamation 6961, imposing a three-year tariff increase on certain broomcorn imports.

The dispute process

Meeting of the Free Trade Commission 
On 11 December 1996, at the request of Mexico and in keeping with Article 2006(4) of NAFTA, the NAFTA Free Trade Commission (FTC) convened to negotiate an agreement between Mexico and the US. On 12 December 1996, Mexico complicated negotiations by imposing retaliatory tariffs amounting to an estimated $1.4 million cost to the US economy. After the requisite 30 days of negotiation had elapsed and no agreement had been reached, Mexico asked on 14 January 1997, that an arbitration tribunal be organized under the rules set out in Article 2008.

Convening of the tribunal 
NAFTA arbitration tribunals under Chapter 20 were convened when negotiations failed to resolve an ongoing dispute. Such a tribunal consisted of five members drawn from a list of "30 individuals who are willing and able to serve as panelists" maintained by each member nation. Potential panelists were "appointed by consensus for terms of three years, and may be reappointed." Article 2009 provided that these panelists:

 have expertise or experience in law, international trade, other matters covered by this Agreement or the resolution of disputes arising under international trade agreements, and shall be chosen strictly on the basis of objectivity, reliability and sound judgment; 
 be independent of, and not be affiliated with or take instructions from, any Party; and
 comply with a code of conduct to be established by the Commission

In accordance with these guidelines, five arbiters were selected:

Chief: Paul O’Connor

Arbiters: Raymundo Enriquez, Dionisio Kaye, John H. Barton, Robert E. Hudec

Submission of arguments 
Rather than sending litigants to argue their cases before the tribunal, parties to a NAFTA arbitration submitted written arguments for review. For both parties the arguments hinged on two significant points:

 Did the tribunal have legitimate jurisdiction in this case?
 The legal definition of the term 'like product' as established in GATT and WTO provisions and incorporated in Article 308.3 of NAFTA.

The US argument 

 The US argued that the NAFTA tribunal did not have jurisdiction in the dispute, as the term 'like product' did not appear word for word in NAFTA, and that while both the US and Mexico were signatories to GATT and members of WTO, the tribunal was not empowered by WTO and therefore did not have jurisdiction in disputes originating from WTO. Therefore, Mexico ought to have taken the case directly to WTO rather than NAFTA.
 Following this same line of argument, the US argued that the "word 'like', while not synonymous with the word 'identical', did call for a greater degree of similarity than is commonly associated with the English word 'similar'", and that NAFTA contained no definition of 'like product' to contradict this understanding. The US further argued that even if the tribunal were to accept the WTO understanding of 'like product', WTO had been inconsistent in its interpretation of the term, and had itself conceded that the interpretation of 'like product' was "to be assessed on a case-by-case basis, and [would] always involve 'an unavoidable element of individual discretionary judgment'".

The Mexican argument 

 Mexico argued that the NAFTA tribunal did have jurisdiction in this case, largely because Articles 802, 803.3, and 805 adopted much of the WTO and GATT language regarding 'like products', even if they weren't phrased identically. They also noted that Article 2005(1) "generally gives parties the right to initiate dispute settlement either in GATT or in NAFTA whenever a dispute involves a matter 'arising under both this Agreement and the General Agreement on Tariffs and Trade'". Finally, Mexico noted that Article 2005(6) required that once either a NAFTA or GATT dispute settlement method was chosen, another could not be engaged to resolve the dispute, so agreement by the US to FTC negotiation had precluded Mexico's ability to arbitrate the case under WTO.
Mexico also argued that, because the GATT principles were already present at least in intent in Articles 802, 803.3, and 805, the definition of 'like product' should be interpreted as it had been interpreted by WTO and GATT. Mexico cited several cases wherein 'like product' was defined broadly to include products that "though not 'like' the imported product, are nonetheless commercially interchangeable or substitutable for it". In this case, that would have meant "US-made plastic brooms were 'like' the imported broomcorn brooms under investigation", and therefore the impact of US imports of Mexican broomcorn brooms had a negligible effect on the overall US broom market.

Final outcome

The NAFTA tribunal's decision 
The tribunal ultimately sided with Mexico on both substantive points and required the US to take immediate steps to right the tariff imbalance.  Specifically the NAFTA tribunal ruled that:

 it ultimately had jurisdiction both because of the similarity between Article 4.1 of GATT and Article 803.3 of NAFTA and because the US had engaged in Article 2005 negotiations with Mexico in the FTC, thus recognizing NAFTA as an appropriate structure within which to arbitrate this issue.
 the preponderance of existing GATT and WTO cases adhered to the definition of 'like products' put forward by Mexico, and the market the US should have considered when deciding the appropriateness of tariffs was the overall broom market, not solely the broomcorn brooms produced by US farmers. The industry in question was therefore not at risk of serious harm from imports of Mexican broomcorn brooms and the new tariffs were not justified.

Responses of the party states 
The US, hoping for favorable solutions to other, concurrent, NAFTA cases it faced against Mexico, complied quickly with the ruling of the tribunal and withdrew the tariffs. Mexico followed with the withdrawal of its retaliatory tariffs.

See also 
 North American Free Trade Agreement
 Mexico–United States relations

References 

North American Free Trade Agreement
International disputes